Frederick "Fred" Jones  (born 1863) was a Welsh international footballer. He was part of the Wales national football team between 1885 and 1886, playing 3 matches. He played his first match on 14 March 1885 against England and his last match on 10 April 1886 against Scotland.

See also
 List of Wales international footballers (alphabetical)

References

1863 births
Welsh footballers
Wales international footballers
Place of birth missing
Date of death missing
Association footballers not categorized by position